Poole Forge is a historic iron forge complex and national historic district located at Narvon, Caernarvon Township, Lancaster County, Pennsylvania. The district includes five contributing buildings and two contributing structures.  They are the Ironmaster's Mansion, Paymaster's Building, spring house, two tenant houses, and ruins of a lime kiln and Pool Forge Covered Bridge.  The oldest section of the Ironmaster's Mansion was built about 1779.  It is an "L"-shaped building built of brownstone and ironstone with Federal style details.

It was listed on the National Register of Historic Places in 1993.

Gallery

References

Historic districts on the National Register of Historic Places in Pennsylvania
Federal architecture in Pennsylvania
Industrial buildings completed in 1779
Buildings and structures in Lancaster County, Pennsylvania
National Register of Historic Places in Lancaster County, Pennsylvania
Lime kilns in the United States